Leon Sanders (May 25, 1867 – August 18, 1937) was a Jewish-American lawyer, politician, and judge from New York.

Life 
Sanders was born on May 25, 1867, in Odessa, the Russian Empire, the son of Nathan Sanders and Elka Green. He immigrated to America with his parents when he was a boy.

Sanders initially worked as a clerk for the banking house Drake, Mastin & Company, later as a bookkeeper for the Baumann Brothers, followed by Edison General Electric Company. He then left Edison to work as a clerk for the Commissioner of Jurors in New York City from 1890 to 1895. While working there, he attended New York Law School and studied law under George H. McAdam. He was admitted to the bar in 1895. He had a speciality for distilleries and wholesale liquor houses, and quickly gained a significant range of clients and reputation as a successful business lawyer.

Sanders was a Tammany Hall leader of his Assembly district, and was an orator and debater for them. In 1898, he was elected to the New York State Assembly as a Democrat, representing the New York County 12th District. He served in the Assembly in 1899, 1900, 1901, and 1902. In 1903, he was elected a Justice in the New York City Municipal Court. He served until 1913, when he resigned to resume his law practice.

In the 1916 United States congressional election, he was the Democratic candidate for New York's 12th congressional district. He lost the election to Socialist Meyer London.

Sanders was very active in Jewish causes and fraternal circles. He was especially concerned with aiding new Jewish immigrants, serving as president of the Hebrew Sheltering and Immigrant Aid Society and chairman of the Committee on Immigration of the American Jewish Congress. He was also Grand Master of the Independent Order of B'rith Abraham, president of the Jewish Fraternal Congress, and a member of the board of governors of the Jewish Maternity Hospital. He was a founder and president of Temple Beth-El in Cedarhurst.

In 1896, Sanders married Bertha Fischer. Their children were Frances Van Pragg, Theresa Penner, and Nathan N.

Sanders was killed in a car accident in California on August 18, 1937. He was buried in Mount Lebanon Cemetery.

References

External links 

 The Political Graveyard

1867 births
1937 deaths
Odesa Jews
Jews from the Russian Empire
People from Odessky Uyezd
American people of Russian-Jewish descent
Emigrants from the Russian Empire to the United States
Jewish American attorneys
Jewish American state legislators in New York (state)
Lawyers from New York City
19th-century American lawyers
20th-century American lawyers
20th-century American judges
Municipal judges in the United States
New York (state) state court judges
Politicians from Manhattan
19th-century American politicians
20th-century American politicians
Democratic Party members of the New York State Assembly
Road incident deaths in California
Burials in New York (state)